Eduardo Buenavista (born 13 October 1978 in Santo Niño, South Cotabato) is a Filipino long-distance runner and two-time Olympian. He holds the Philippine record for multiple long-distance events.

His best marathon time is 2:18:44 hours. He also holds the Philippine 5000 metres record of 13 minutes, 58 seconds, and performed the 10,000 metres in 29:02.36 minutes.

"Vertek", as called by his friends and the media, finished 67th in the 2004 Athens Olympic marathon. He was a silver medallist in the 23rd Southeast Asian Games in the 10,000m run. He has also won many road races in the Philippines, distance races on previous South East Asian Games the Adidas King of the Road in South Korea and the Adidas King of the Road 2012 in Singapore.

International competitions

Personal bests

References

External links
 Eduardo Buenavista's profile

1978 births
Living people
Sportspeople from General Santos
Filipino male long-distance runners
Filipino male steeplechase runners
Filipino male marathon runners
Olympic track and field athletes of the Philippines
Athletes (track and field) at the 2000 Summer Olympics
Athletes (track and field) at the 2004 Summer Olympics
Athletes (track and field) at the 2002 Asian Games
Athletes (track and field) at the 2006 Asian Games
Athletes (track and field) at the 2010 Asian Games
World Athletics Championships athletes for the Philippines
Southeast Asian Games medalists in athletics
Southeast Asian Games gold medalists for the Philippines
Southeast Asian Games competitors for the Philippines
Southeast Asian Games silver medalists for the Philippines
Southeast Asian Games bronze medalists for the Philippines
Competitors at the 2001 Southeast Asian Games
Competitors at the 2003 Southeast Asian Games
Competitors at the 2005 Southeast Asian Games
Competitors at the 2007 Southeast Asian Games
Competitors at the 2009 Southeast Asian Games
Competitors at the 2011 Southeast Asian Games
Asian Games competitors for the Philippines